Ross Kenry O'Donovan (born 17 June 1987), also known as RubberNinja and RubberRoss, is an Australian animator, voice actor, and Internet personality. He is known for his solo work as a Twitch streamer, as well as his YouTube and Newgrounds cartoons and animations. He co-hosted the internet show Steam Train, a spin-off of YouTube Let's Play series Game Grumps.

Early life
O'Donovan was born on 17 June 1987 in Perth, Western Australia to Irish Catholic parents. His sister Rebecca is a journalist in Australia, and is married to Australian cricketer Shaun Marsh.

O'Donovan attended Corpus Christi College. After graduating from college, he studied and instructed animation at the Film and Television Institute of Western Australia in Fremantle.

Career 
O'Donovan began his career by posting animated shorts to Newgrounds under the name "RubberNinja". He would later establish a YouTube channel and begin uploading content there. His best known work was the series Gamer Tonight, which was produced for the ABC2 video game-based program Good Game. The series featured a fictitious talk show whose host, voiced by frequent-collaborator Arin Hanson, would interview various types of gamers.

He also created the show Gameoverse, which featured Hanson in every speaking role. Gameoverse has since been put on hiatus, though O'Donovan has confirmed the series will return.

In August 2014, O'Donovan uploaded a video expressing his concerns with animation videos on YouTube. Discussing the changes made to YouTube's algorithms, he stated that the website was now accommodating live-action videos over animated videos due to the algorithm's emphasis on retention time and upload frequencies which would impede animation channels. In spite of this, O'Donovan has continued releasing animations periodically.

Game Grumps

In 2013, after Jon Jafari's departure from the YouTube Let's Play series Game Grumps, co-host Arin Hanson launched a second show on the Game Grumps platform. Originally conceptualized by O'Donovan, the show Steam Train had O'Donovan joined by Ninja Sex Party vocalist Dan Avidan, where both would play PC games (the title referencing online retailer Steam). Later episodes of the series would see O'Donovan paired with other members of the Game Grumps channel and other content creators.

In June 2015, O'Donovan launched a 5-episode miniseries on the Game Grumps channel called Guild Grumps. O'Donovan mentored 4 members of the Game Grumps crew in a 5-day race to advance from Level 90 to Level 100 in the Warlords of Draenor expansion of World of Warcraft.

After Game Grumps 
In 2020, O'Donovan left Game Grumps on good terms, to prioritize making his own content. He has returned on multiple occasions as a guest and made a brief cameo in a video commemorating the series' 10th anniversary. His new YouTube channel, RubberRoss, reached over 1 million subscribers in 2022.

In August 2020, O'Donovan was the target of a controversial advertising campaign by Burger King and the ad agency Ogilvy. The companies used a feature on Twitch that allows viewers to donate small amounts of money in order to broadcast unsolicited advertisements. Clips from these streams were later used in a video advertisement. O'Donovan made a series of tweets criticizing the campaign, calling the practice "scummy as hell". The tweets, as well as additional statements from O'Donovan, were used in articles by BBC, Kotaku, and PC Gamer while reporting on the issue.

Personal life
On 29 September 2012, O'Donovan married Holly Conrad, a cosplayer, propmaker, and special effects artist who was featured in Comic-Con Episode IV: A Fan's Hope and Heroes of Cosplay. On 19 September 2018, Conrad and O'Donovan announced on their respective Twitter pages that they would be splitting up amicably, citing Conrad's decision to move to Seattle.

On 9 April 2021, O’Donovan announced on Twitter that his mother had died due to lung cancer.

Philanthropy
During production of the series Guild Grumps, each participant had $1,000 to donate to a charity of their choice if they reached the goal. If they did not, their donation would be split between those who won. In the end, O'Donovan was the sole winner and, combined with the participants' distributed funds, donated $5,000 to cancer research.

As of 2015, O'Donovan and Game Grumps have raised over $70,000 by hosting charity livestreams on Twitch.

Awards and nominations

Filmography

Web series

Video games

Music videos

Notes

References

External links

1987 births
Australian animators
Australian animated film directors
Australian expatriates in the United States
Australian male voice actors
Australian people of Irish descent
Australian YouTubers
Living people
YouTube animators
People from Perth, Western Australia
Maker Studios people
Video game commentators
Newgrounds people
Flash artists